General Staff Department may refer to:
 General Staff Department of the Korean People's Army
 People's Liberation Army General Staff Department